Odesa-Holovna railway station is the main train station in Odesa in southern Ukraine. It was built in the second half of the 19th century. It was damaged in 1944 during World War II and was rebuilt in 1952. It is situated in the city center of Odesa.

History
The first building of Odesa Railway Station was "П"-shaped. It's shorter part faced the station square, continuing the axis of Pushkinska Street. Trains entered the station between the longer side buildings. Between the buildings, platforms were placed and they ended in front of the shorter building. Such a terminus was formed because Odesa was, at that time, the end of the line next to the Black Sea. Station building collapsed during World War II in 1944. It was restored in 1952 according to A.M. Chuprin's project (instead of the destroyed one during the fascist occupation of Odesa). The new station building was remodeled in 2006.

External links 

Official Website

Odessa
Buildings and structures in Odesa
Railway station
Neoclassical architecture in Ukraine